Mermithidae is a family of nematode worms that are endoparasites in arthropods. As early as 1877, Mermithidae was listed as one of nine subdivisions of the Nematoidea. Mermithidae are confused with the horsehair worms of the phylum Nematomorpha that have a similar life history and appearance.

Mermithids are parasites, mainly of arthropods. Most are known from insects, but some are recorded from spiders, scorpions and crustaceans. A few are known to parasitize earthworms, leeches and molluscs, and a specimen is known from a spider preserved in Baltic amber.

At least 25 species are known to parasitize mosquito larvae, making them of considerable interest in biological control.
A species, probably Pheromermis vesparum, was recorded from the invasive Asian hornet (Vespa velutina) in France. The parasite was considered to be a member of the local fauna which had adapted to a new host. However, the authors concluded that the mermithid could not hamper the hornet invasion nor be used in biological control programs against this invasive species.

Life history
Mermithids are wire-like and have a smooth cuticle with layers of spiral fibres. The digestive tract is similar to that of free-living nematodes only in the young larvae prior to their parasitic life; in the parasitic stages the oesophagus is disconnected from the mid-intestine, and females lack an anus. The female genital opening is at the midbody, while the male opening is at the tip and visible as one or two spicules. The eggs are laid either in water or on land, and the newly hatched larvae are free-living, as are the adults that emerge from the hosts to lay eggs.

The taxonomy of the group has been confused due to poor specimen collection as well as very limited morphological characteristics, and most are discovered by entomologists rather than nematologists. Even the best-studied species, Romanomermis culicivorax, has an unclear taxonomic status.

Host behavior alteration
Mermithid nematodes induce water-seeking behavior in their hosts, by relying on altering the host's hemolymph osmolality (concentration of salt) to achieve the same effect.

Included genera
These genera are included in the family:
 Abathymermis Rubtsov, 1871
 Aranimermis
 †Cretacimermis Poinar, 2001
Eumermis Daday, 1911
Gastromermis Micoletzky, 1923
 †Heydenius Taylor, 1935
 Hydromermis Corti, 1902
Lanceimermis Artyukhovskii, 1969
 Mermis Dujardin, 1842
 Pheromermis Poinar, Lane & Thomas, 1976
 Quadrimermis Coman, 1961
 Reesimermis Tsai & Grundman, 1969
 Romanomermis
 Spiculimermis Artyukhovskii, 1963
 Strelkovimermis Rubzov, 1969
 Tetramermis Steiner, 1925

References

External links 

 Biological control potential
 https://web.archive.org/web/20081214081804/http://flnem.ifas.ufl.edu/HISTORY/entomophilic_history.htm
 https://web.archive.org/web/20091014110925/http://www.uel.ac.uk/mosquito/issue10/mermithids.htm
  Mermis nigrescens on the UF / IFAS Featured Creatures Web site

Parasitic nematodes of animals
Mind-altering parasites
Nematode families
Endoparasites